The Mouth of the Wolf can refer to:

 The Mouth of the Wolf (1988 film), a 1988 Peruvian film
 The Mouth of the Wolf (2009 film), a 2009 Italian film